Metaloricaria is a genus of armored catfishes native to South America.

Taxonomy 
The phylogenetic position of Metaloricaria remains uncertain. Though classified in the tribe Harttiini in the subfamily Loricariinae, the length of the maxillary barbels (longer than in all other Harttiini), low number of teeth and their reduced size, reduction of the number of caudal-fin rays, and sexual dimorphism reminiscent of that seen in the Rineloricaria group, tend to support a closer relationship of Metaloricaria with the tribe Loricariini.

Species
There are currently two recognized species in this genus:
 Metaloricaria nijsseni (Boeseman, 1976)
 Metaloricaria paucidens Isbrücker, 1975

Distribution and habitat 
Metaloricaria is only known from the Guiana Shield in French Guiana and Suriname where the species occupy an ecological niche similar to that of Harttia. The species are rarely found in their natural environment and inhabit primarily streams over rocky and sandy substrates.

Description 
Sexual dimorphism includes hypertrophied development of odontodes arranged in brushes along the sides of the head and on the spine and rays of the pectoral fins in mature males. Females also possess such brushes along sides of the head, but do not seem to develop pectoral-fin enlarged odontodes.

References 

Harttiini
Freshwater fish genera
Fish of French Guiana
Fish of Suriname
Catfish genera
Taxa named by Isaäc J. H. Isbrücker